Salvador Estañ Campello (born 6 June 1958), is a Spanish retired footballer who played as a defender.

Club career
Campello started at Elche and was honoured by his club with a commemorative plaque in 2014 for his services.

International career
He was called up to the Spain under-20 side for the 1977 FIFA World Youth Championship in Tunisia and the Spain under-21 side in 1980, but did not make an appearance for either.

References

External links

1958 births
Living people
Spanish footballers
Association football defenders
La Liga players
Segunda División players
Elche CF players
Real Murcia players
CD Tenerife players
Spain youth international footballers